{{DISPLAYTITLE:C5H6}}
The molecular formula C5H6 (molar mass: 66.10 g/mol, exact mass: 66.04695 u) may refer to:

 Cyclopentadiene
 Cyclopropylacetylene
 [1.1.1]propellane
 Cyclopentyne

Molecular formulas